The 2005–06 Moldovan National Division was the 15th season of top-tier football in Moldova.

League standings

NB: no relegation due to extension of the league to 10 clubs

Results

First and second round

Third and fourth round

Top goalscorers

References
Moldova - List of final tables (RSSSF)
 Divizia Națională 2005-06 at soccerway
 Statistica Generala Divizia Națională 2005-2006  - www.divizianationala.com
 Arhiva campionatelor Moldovei - FMF.md
 Divizia Națională 2005-2006 at betexplorer

Moldovan Super Liga seasons
1
Moldova